Shearwater, The Mullumbimby Steiner School, also known as Shearwater Steiner School, is a private co-ed school that caters for primary and secondary education; years K-12. There is also a pre-school day care on campus. It is so named after the Shearwater bird; its local township, "Biggest Little Town in Australia", Mullumbimby, in New South Wales; and because it is based on the philosophy of Rudolf Steiner.

History
The school was founded on 8 February 1993 as a small community Steiner School for the surrounding regional area. It was originally located in the home of Stan Stevens and Sally Davison, offering Kindergarten, year 1 and year 2. The classes grew too large and the school was soon moved to a new property and the current location in September 1993, with the installation of an administration centre and several primary school buildings. After several stages of construction, the school developed into a complete primary to secondary (K-12) college. The most recent upgrade has been the construction of a 'state of the art' Performance Hall.

Description
A primary focus of the school's construction was ecological sustainability. The school is built around a creek that runs through the land on which the school is located; the geology of the land has been maintained with the buildings constructed around the naturally formed creek and hills. The administrative building, some primary rooms, and the school's library encircle a large fig tree which is supposed to be 50 years old. The school also has an on-site waste-water treatment centre.  Upon the school's foundation at the current property, there has been extensive effort made towards the school's Rainforest Creek Regeneration Project, which is focused upon the local creek and its flora. Approximately 8000 native trees have been planted under the project.

The school occasionally hosts festivals, most notably during the spring equinox.  The school's largest annual project and a large source of income is the Wearable Arts Vision in Education. The Wearable Arts Performance Event is held on-campus and is held over several evenings with a variety of shows including fashion shows, dramatic works, and live music performances. (See external links for more info.)

Gallery

References

External links
 Shearwater Steiner School Website
 A special community
 WAVE Information
 WAVE Website

Private schools in New South Wales
Rudolf Steiner
Northern Rivers